Periyakulam Govindaswamy Sundararajan (pen name: Chitti) (20 April 1910 – 23 June 2006) was an Indian writer who was associated with the Manikodi. At the time of his death in 2006, he was the last surviving contributor to the Manikodi magazine.

References 
4. Literature provided him Solace. The Hindu. 07th July 2017

20th-century Indian essayists
1910 births
2006 deaths